Huang Chung-yi (born 12 October 1967 in Hualien County, Taiwan) is a Taiwanese retired baseball player.

Career
A bright star since young, Huang competed in the 1992 Summer Olympics and won the silver medal. After the 1992 Olympics Huang entered CPBL along with then just-established Jungo Bears and stayed with the team and its successors Sinon Bears and Sinon Bulls to date. With his seniority and the so many accomplishments achieved, he was appointed as head coach by the Sinon Bulls after the end of CPBL's 2006 season, but still maintains the identity of player.

Huang's major achievements during his CPBL career:
Hit 3 home runs in a single game in his rookie year on April 27, 1993(versus China Times Eagles in Taichung Baseball Field), the 2nd player to achieve so in the CPBL history.
Reached career 1000th hits fastest in the CPBL history on June 13, 2002, in within only 876 games.
Accumulates most appearances(1332 appearances as of July 2007) and most hits(1509 hits as of July 2007) in the CPBL history, and are still accumulating.
Competed in the 1992 and 2004 Olympics, at an interval of 12 years.

Basic Information
Number: 17 (1989~ )
Height: 174 cm
Weight: 82 kg
Bats/throws:  R/R
Position: Second baseman

Career statistics

In 1992 Olympics:
{|border=1　
|- style="background:LIGHTGREY" align=middle
|Batting average||Games||At bat||Runs||Hits||RBI||Doubles||Triples||HR||K||BB
|- align=middle
||.324||9||37||8||12||4||2||1||1||3||2
|-
|}

CPBL career:

References

 profile

1967 births
Living people
Asian Games bronze medalists for Chinese Taipei
Asian Games medalists in baseball
Asian Games silver medalists for Chinese Taipei
Baseball players at the 1992 Summer Olympics
Baseball players at the 1990 Asian Games
Baseball players at the 1998 Asian Games
Baseball players at the 2002 Asian Games
Baseball players at the 2004 Summer Olympics
Baseball second basemen
Medalists at the 1992 Summer Olympics
Medalists at the 1998 Asian Games
Medalists at the 2002 Asian Games
Olympic baseball players of Taiwan
Olympic medalists in baseball
Olympic silver medalists for Taiwan
People from Hualien County
Taiwanese baseball players
Sinon Bulls managers